The Gotel Mountain soft-furred mouse (Praomys obscurus) or Gotel Mountain praomys, is a species of rodent in the family Muridae. It is endemic to the Gotel Mountains in southeastern Nigeria. It is threatened by habitat loss (deforestation), presumably caused by logging and the conversion of land to agricultural and other uses.

References

Gotel Mountain soft-furred mouse
Mammals of West Africa
Endemic fauna of Nigeria
Gotel Mountain soft-furred mouse
Taxonomy articles created by Polbot